St James' Church is an historic Roman Catholic Churc in Vidattaltivu village in Mannar District in Sri Lanka.

History
According to Rev. Fr. Antonainus's book of The Chronicle of the Sanctuary of Our Lady of Madhu,  St James Church is over 400 years old. The Franciscan historian Friar Paulo da Trinidade (1571-1651) stated that Franciscan monks build St James Church before 1594. 

Catholic Sri Lankas settled in Vidattaltivu from Jaffna, Navaali, and Allaipitti, and the church was built to accommodate them.

From 1948 St James Church was run under Iranaitheevu parish. The priests traveled by boat from Iranaitheevu by boat to perform mass and other duties at St. James.. Then the church was moved under the Adampan parish. Now it is Vidathaltheevu parish.

References

 Trinidade,Conquesta Spiritual Do Oriente. (Translated by Rt.Rev. Edmund Peiris, OMI), 1972.
 The Chronicle of the Sanctuary of Our Lady of Madhu (up to 1950) with the Life and Labours of the Missionaries Connected with it by. A.J.B.Antaninus
 Christianity in Sri Lanka under Portuguese By. Martin Quere. O.M.I

Churches in Mannar District
Roman Catholic churches in the Diocese of Mannar